2nd class is a rank used by the Russian Navy and a number of former communist state. The rank is a non-commissioned officer and is equivalent to Junior sergeant in armies and air forces. Within NATO forces, the rank is rated as OR-5 and is equivalent to Petty officer second class or Petty officer in English speaking navies.

Russia

The rank was introduced to the Soviet Navy 2 November 1940.

In the navy of the Russian Federation there are four ranks in the petty officer´s career group, which means:

 Rank insignia  Starshina 1st stage

Insignia

See also
 Ranks and rank insignia of the Red Army 1940–1943
 Ranks and rank insignia of the Soviet Army 1943–1955, ... 1955–1991
 Ranks and rank insignia of the Russian Federation's armed forces 1994–2010
 Naval ranks and insignia of the Russian Federation

References

Military ranks of Russia
Military ranks of the Soviet Union